Edith Maud Rawdon-Hastings, 10th Countess of Loudoun (10 December 1833 – 23 January 1874) was a Scottish peer. She died aged 40 after caring for Rowallan Castle. Sir George Gilbert Scott designed an Eleanor Cross style monument to her which was erected in Ashby de la Zouch.

Early life

Rawdon-Hastings was the second child and eldest daughter of George Rawdon-Hastings, 2nd Marquess of Hastings, the British peer and courtier, and his wife Barbara née Yelverton, 20th Baroness Grey de Ruthyn. Her elder brother was Paulyn Rawdon-Hastings, 3rd Marquess of Hastings, who died unmarried. Among her younger siblings were Lady Bertha Rawdon-Hastings (wife of Augustus Wykeham Clifton), Lady Victoria Rawdon-Hastings, Henry Rawdon-Hastings (who married Lady Florence Paget, only daughter of Henry Paget, 2nd Marquess of Anglesey), and Lady Frances Rawdon-Hastings (wife of Charles Marsham, 4th Earl of Romney). Fifteen months after her father's death in 1844, her mother married Capt. Hastings Henry, nephew of the Duke of Leinster, who took took the name of Yelverton by royal license in 1849. From her mother's second marriage, she had a younger half-sister, Hon. Barbara Yelverton, who later married John Yarde-Buller, 2nd Baron Churston.

His mother, who inherited the barony when only seven months old, was the only child of Henry Yelverton, 19th Baron Grey de Ruthyn (a friend of Lord Byron) and the former Anna Maria Kellam. Her paternal grandparents were Francis Rawdon-Hastings, 1st Marquess of Hastings and his wife, Flora Mure-Campbell, 6th Countess of Loudoun.

Career
She was greatly attached to the old Mure family mansion of Rowallan Castle near Kilmaurs in Ayrshire, and funded restorations of it.

In 1866, Rawdon-Hastings drew a picture which she called "Skeleton Ball". This picture is now in the Tate.

Personal life
On 30 April 1853, she married Charles Clifton, 1st Baron Donington, who took the name Abney-Hastings, as a condition of inheriting from a second cousin Sir Charles Abney-Hastings, 2nd Bt, a natural grandson of the 10th Earl of Huntingdon (brother of Lady Edith's grandmother). They had six children:
 
 Lady Flora Paulyna Hetty Barbara Abney Hastings (1854–1887), who married Henry Fitzalan-Howard, 15th Duke of Norfolk.
 Charles Edward Hastings Clifton, 11th Earl of Loudoun (1855–1920), who married the Hon. Alice Fitzalan-Howard, daughter of Edward Fitzalan-Howard, 1st Baron Howard of Glossop (himself the second son of Henry Howard, 13th Duke of Norfolk), in 1880.
 Paulyn Francis Cuthbert Rawdon-Hastings (1856–1907), a Major who married Lady Maud Grimston, daughter of James Grimston, 2nd Earl of Verulam.
 Gilbert Theophilus Clifton Clifton-Hastings-Campbell, 3rd Baron Donington (1859–1927), who married Maud Kemble Hamilton, daughter of Sir Charles Hamilton, 1st Baronet.
 Henry Cecil Plantagenet Clifton (b. 1860), who married Maharaja Duleep Singh's companion and was subsequently ostracised when the party went in exile.
 Lady Egidia Sophia Frederica Christina Clifton (1870–1892), who died young.

After her death, her widowed husband was created Baron Donington. After she died, the Loudoun monument was erected in Ashby. The octagonal monument by Sir George Gilbert Scott is based on the Eleanor crosses and is now a Grade II* listed structure.

Descendants
Through her son Paulyn, she was a grandmother of Edith Abney-Hastings, later 12th Countess of Loudoun.

Through her son Gilbert, she was a grandmother of four granddaughters, including Hon. Selina Clifton-Hastings-Campbell, who married Sir Edward McTaggart-Stewart, 2nd Baronet.

References

1833 births
1874 deaths
Earls of Loudoun
Hereditary women peers
Scottish countesses
Daughters of British marquesses
Edith
19th-century Scottish people
19th-century Scottish women
Barons Hastings
Barons Botreaux
Barons Hungerford